We're an American Band is the seventh studio album by American hard rock band Grand Funk Railroad, credited as Grand Funk. The album was released by Capitol Records on July 15, 1973 (see 1973 in music) and was certified gold by the RIAA a little over a month after its release. Two singles were released from the album. The first single, "We're an American Band", was released on July 2, 1973 and the second, "Walk Like a Man", was released on October 29, 1973. Both singles were sung by drummer Don Brewer.  There is an addition to the band on this release - Craig Frost - who plays the organ, clavinet and Moog.  Craig was credited as an additional musician on Phoenix which was released the previous year.

The album cover was originally covered in gold-colored foil on the outside, and the initial run of pressings were pressed in clear, dark yellow vinyl to simulate or suggest a "gold" record. The album has been reissued many times and is currently available in the Compact Disc format. A Quadraphonic mix of the album was available in the Quadraphonic 8-Track cartridge format.

The album is #200 of the National Association of Recording Merchandisers (NARM) Definitive 200 albums of all time.

Recording, production, artwork, and packaging
We're an American Band was the group's first collaboration with producer/engineer Todd Rundgren. Rundgren and the band recorded the album at Criteria Studios in Miami, Florida on June 13–15, 1973. Rundgren would go on to produce the band's next album, Shinin' On (1974), before the band switched to Jimmy Ienner.

The album's original issue, as well as the "We're an American Band" single, was on translucent yellow vinyl, symbolic of a 'Gold record'. The album labels, above the side numbers, instructed listeners to play "at full volume". It included four stickers (two blue, and two red) with the Grand Funk "Pointing Finger" logo. Emphasizing the shortening of the group's name, the word "Railroad" does not appear anywhere on the album sleeve, liner, or vinyl record, except as the title of the first song on side two of the album.

Reception
Upon the album's release, We're an American Band became the band's best received album by critics, so far. Robert Christgau gave the album a B−, his highest rating for a Grand Funk Railroad album at the time (although Shinin' On (1974) and Grand Funk Hits (1976) would receive a B and B+, respectively). A modern review of the album by William Ruhlmann for AllMusic stated that the album was a departure from the band's usual material, which was mostly due to Todd Rundgren's production and Don Brewer's increase in lead vocal work. Ruhlmann also said that the album sounded more professional than their previous ones.

It peaked at number 2 on the Billboard 200, the band's highest position on the chart, but spent one week at number 1 on the Cash Box, and Record World album charts.

Track listing

Personnel
Per sleeve notes

 Mark Farner – vocals, guitar, acoustic guitar, conga; electric piano on "Creepin'"
 Craig Frost – organ, clavinet, electric piano, Moog
 Mel Schacher – bass
 Don Brewer – vocals, drums, percussion

Production
Per sleeve notes
 Todd Rundgren – producer, engineer
 Francesco Damanti – engineer
 Seth Snyder – assistant engineer
 Lynn Goldsmith & Andrew Cavaliere – album design and concept
 Lynn Goldsmith – photography
 John Hoernle – art direction
 Andrew Cavaliere – management

Charts

Singles

References

1973 albums
Grand Funk Railroad albums
Albums produced by Todd Rundgren
Capitol Records albums